Adam Gold(e) may refer to:

Adam Golde, politician
Adam Gold (radio presenter) on WPTK
Adam Gold (musician); see The Mendoza Line (band)